96.5 Wave FM (call sign 2UUL) is a commercial radio station broadcasting on the FM band to the Illawarra region of New South Wales, Australia. It is owned by ARN after ARN's purchase of the Grant Broadcasters radio network. 96.5 Wave FM competes with rival i98 at the top of the Illawarra's ratings for radio listenership.

History 
The station was born as 2WL and commenced broadcasting on 18 July 1931. The station was owned by Wollongong Broadcasting Pty Ltd. The station studio and offices were in Edward St, Wollongong and were linked to a broadcasting antenna at Unanderra. The station was officially opened by J. P. Caddy, president of the Illawarra Chamber of Commerce and Industry.

In November 1980, 2WL went off air briefly after a tornado badly damaged 2WL's Port Kembla broadcast tower. After 61 years of AM broadcasting, the station moved to the FM band in July 1992.

In July 2021, it was announced that prominent i98 announcers Lyndal Rogers and Ryan Cram would be moving to the competition, joining Wave FM to host a new drive show. Their show replaced the nationally syndicated Nova program Kate, Tim & Joel.

In November 2021, the Australian Radio Network (ARN) announced the acquisition of the Grant Broadcasters radio network, which included Wave FM.

In September 2021, former Australian Idol winner Damien Leith joined the breakfast show as an announcer after a successful stint doing breakfast radio at sister station Power FM in Muswellbrook.

Presenters
 Damien Leith, Breakfast
 Jade Tonta, Breakfast
 Dean Kesby, Mornings
 Matthew Brokenbrough, Workday
 Lyndal Rogers, Drive
 Ryan Cram, Drive

References

Radio stations in New South Wales
Radio stations established in 1931
1931 establishments in Australia
Australian Radio Network
South Coast (New South Wales)